Pseudopostega acuminata is a moth of the family Opostegidae. It was described by Donald R. Davis and Jonas R. Stonis, 2007. It is known from northern Argentina and north-western Venezuela.

The length of the forewings is 3.1–3.3 mm. Adults have been recorded in February (in Venezuela) and April (in Argentina).

Etymology
The species name is derived from the Latin acuminatus (meaning pointed, sharpened), in reference to the long, slender, acute caudal lobe of the male gnathos.

References

Opostegidae
Moths described in 2007